Westport, Nova Scotia is a village in Digby County, Nova Scotia and it is located on Brier Island in the Bay of Fundy. As of 2021, the population was 193.

History
The settlement began with the arrival of David Welch and his family in 1769, as well as the Morrells. This was followed by the arrival of several more  United Empire Loyalist families in 1783.

The village was incorporated in 1946.

A ferry service connects the village with Freeport, Nova Scotia on Long Island. A second ferry runs from Digby Neck to Long Island.

Joshua Slocum, the first person to sail solo around the world, grew up in Westport, where his mother was born. A monument in his memory was built on the southern end of the village.

Mathematician Roland Richardson was the principal of Westport's high school from 1899 to 1902.

Demographics 

References

C. Bruce Fergusson, "Westport", Place-Names and Places of Nova Scotia Nova Scotia Archives (1967), p. 727
"Brier Island" The Davis Family online family history

Communities in Digby County, Nova Scotia
Villages in Nova Scotia
Designated places in Nova Scotia
General Service Areas in Nova Scotia